The 2019 Ligai Olii Tojikiston (Tajik: 2019 Лигаи Олии Тоҷикистон) or 2019 Tajikistan Higher League was the 28th season of Ligai Olii Tojikiston, Tajikistan's top division of association football. The season will begin on 6 April 2019. and finished on 4 November 2019.

Teams
On 19 February 2019, the Tajikistan Football Federation announced that the season would involve eight teams, consisting of Istiklol, Khujand, Kuktosh, Regar-TadAZ, Khatlon, CSKA Pamir, Panjshir and newly promoted Istaravshan.

Foreign players
Each Tajikistan Higher League club is permitted to register six foreign players, with four allowed on the pitch at the same time.

In bold: Players that have been capped for their national team.

Managerial changes

League table

Results

Results 1–14

Results 15–21

Results by round

Position by round

Matches

Week 1

Week 2

Week 3

Week 4

Week 5

Week 6

Week 7

Week 8

Week 9

Week 10

Week 11

Week 12

Week 13

Week 14

Week 15

Week 16

Week 17

Week 18

Week 19

Week 20

Week 21

Relegation play-offs
The 2019 season ended with a relegation play-off between the 7th-placed Tajikistan Higher League team, and the runners-up of the Tajik First Division, on a two-legged confrontation.

Season statistics

Scoring
 First goal of the season:

Top scorers

Hat-tricks

 5 Player scored 5 goals

References

External links
Football federation of Tajikistan

Tajikistan Higher League seasons
1
Tajik